West Wind Aviation Flight 282 was a domestic passenger flight from Fond-du-Lac Airport to Stony Rapids Airport, Canada. The aircraft was an ATR 42-320 registered C-GWEA. On 13 December 2017, shortly after taking off from Fond-du-Lac, the ATR-42 lost altitude and hit the ground. All 25 passengers and crew initially survived the crash, but one passenger later died of his injuries in hospital. Investigation on the cause of the crash determined that it was caused by ice contamination on the aircraft.

Aircraft and crew 

The aircraft was an ATR 42-320 registered C-GWEA and was equipped with two PW121 turboprop engines produced by Pratt & Whitney Canada. The aircraft entered service in 1991 with Aviación del Noroeste, and was later transferred to a few operators, including Zambia Airways, United Nations, and Fly540. The aircraft joined the fleet of West Wind Aviation in 2012, and was aged 26.8 years at the time of the crash. This type of aircraft has previously been associated with accidents due to ice forming on the wing in freezing weather. The most notable accident was American Eagle Flight 4184. Experts say that changes in procedures and aircraft systems have solved the problem.

The flight crew consisted of two captains. The one in command had been with the airline in 2010 and had 5,990 flight hours, including 1,500 hours on the ATR 42. The second captain (acting as a first officer on the accident flight), had been with the airline since 2000 and had 15,769 flight hours with 7,930 of them on the ATR 42.

Accident 

The accident took place on December 13, 2017. At 6:15 pm local time, the aircraft began its takeoff roll from Fond-du-Lac Airport. There was an  trail of debris. The aircraft finally came to a stop in the upright position yet tilted to the right. The most serious damage was on the left side of the airframe, where it ruptured near seats Row 3. There was no explosion nor fires at the crash site, but fuel leaks were found by nearby residents who rushed over for rescue work.

Rescue work was immediately launched by local residents. Some of them followed the screams and rushed to the crash site near the airport, helping people to get out. The passengers also struggled to save themselves. Four of them tried for half an hour and managed to open the emergency exit door. Other passengers left the aircraft and guided local residents to the crash site. People sent out alerts through Facebook, calling for more resources, and in 10–20 minutes more people arrived with blankets. Within a few hours, all aircraft occupants were rescued. Royal Canadian Mounted Police finally took over the crash site.

There were 25 people on board, including 22 passengers, 2 pilots and 1 flight attendant. Nobody was killed initially, but six passengers and one crew member received serious injuries, at least five of whom were transported to hospital via air ambulance. The other 18 aircraft occupants received minor injuries. A 19-year-old passenger died on 25 December 2017 as a result of his injuries.

Investigation 
Transportation Safety Board of Canada launched the investigation. BEA, ATR (aircraft manufacturer), Pratt & Whitney Canada (engine manufacturer), and Transport Canada also sent representatives to the site.  Flight recorders were recovered and sent to the lab in Ottawa.

West Wind Aviation's air operator certificate was suspended on 22 December 2017 by Transport Canada, due to deficiencies in the company's operational control system. They were allowed to fly again on May 8, 2018, after Transport Canada said West Wind had addressed the regulator's concerns about deficiencies in the company's operational control system.

A year after the crash, the preliminary investigation made by the Canadian TSB suggested that icing might have largely contributed to the crash. The departure airport of Flight 282, Fond-du-Lac Airport, was not equipped with adequate de-icing equipment, with official commented it as "seriously inadequate".  Polls conducted by TSB also revealed that at least 40% of pilots rarely or never have their aircraft de-iced in remote airports. Due to these findings, recommendation on better de-icing procedure throughout remote Canadian airports was issued to Transport Canada. Subsequently, investigators ruled out engine failure as likely cause of the crash.

See also

American Eagle Flight 4184
Ice protection system
Aero Trasporti Italiani Flight 460
Aero Caribbean Flight 883
TransAsia Airways Flight 791

References

External links 
 
 

Aviation accidents and incidents in 2017
Accidents and incidents involving the ATR 42
Aviation accidents and incidents in Canada
2017 disasters in Canada
2017 in Saskatchewan
December 2017 events in Canada
Airliner accidents and incidents caused by ice